The Minister for Economic Affairs was a position in the Ministry of Dáil Éireann, the government of the Irish Republic, a self-declared state which was established in 1919 by Dáil Éireann, the parliamentary assembly made up of the majority of Irish MPs elected in the 1918 general election. The portfolio was created to promote economic growth and development throughout the country. It also existed in the First Provisional Government of Ireland, established after the ratification of the Anglo-Irish Treaty.

Minister for Economic Affairs

Economic Affairs